The 1973–74 FIBA Women's European Champions Cup was the fourteenth edition of FIBA Europe's competition for women's basketball national champion clubs, running from November 1973 to April 1974. Daugava Riga defeated Clermont UC in a rematch of the past edition's final to win its eleventh title in a row.

Preliminary round

First round

Group stage

Group A

Group B

Semifinals

Final

References

Champions Cup
EuroLeague Women seasons